HMS Oracle was an  which served in the Royal Navy during the First World War. The M class were an improvement on the previous , capable of higher speed. The vessel was launched on 23 December 1915 and joined the Grand Fleet. Oracle spent much of the war involved in anti-submarine warfare. In August 1916, the destroyer rescued the crew of the light cruiser , which had been sunk by a German submarine. In August 1917, the destroyer rammed and sank the submarine . After the Armistice that marked the end of the First World War, the destroyer was transferred to Portsmouth. Initially, the destroyer was part of the local defence flotilla but soon Oracle was placed in reserve, decommissioned and, on 30 October 1921, sold to be broken up.

Design and development
Oracle was one of twenty-two  destroyers ordered by the British Admiralty in November 1914 as part of the Third War Construction Programme.

Armament consisted of three  Mk IV QF guns on the ship's centreline, with one on the forecastle, one aft on a raised platform and one between the middle and aft funnels. A single 2-pounder (40 mm) pom-pom anti-aircraft gun was carried, while torpedo armament consisted of two twin mounts for  torpedoes. The ship had a complement of 76 officers and ratings.

Construction and career
Laid down by William Doxford & Sons of Sunderland, Oracle was launched on 23 December 1915 and completed during August the following year The destroyer was the first Royal Navy ship to be named after the Oracle, a prophet of antiquity. The vessel was deployed as part of the Grand Fleet, joining the Thirteenth Destroyer Flotilla at Scapa Flow.

The destroyer was active in anti-submarine warfare but with variable results. On 19 August 1916, the destroyer, alongside sister ship , was sent to destroy the German submarine  that had sunk the light cruiser . The destroyers failed to find the submarine, but did ensure many of the sailors were rescued. On 18 January 1917, the destroyer was one of six destroyers that undertook patrols termed "high speed sweeps" in the North Sea using paravanes. No submarines were sighted. On 12 August, the destroyer had greater success. The vessel was the submarine , hastily disguised with a sail. The destroyer sped towards the submarine, which dived, rose and dived again in an attempt to escape. The destroyer discharged four rounds of gunfire, which missed, and then rammed the submarine between the conning tower and stern. The submarine sank with no survivors. This was a rare success and soon afterwards, the Admiralty withdrew the destroyers like Oracle from patrols and reallocated them to be escorts for convoys, which proved more effective at preventing losses from submarines.

After the armistice, the Grand Fleet was disbanded and Oracle joined the Defence Flotilla at Portsmouth. However, the end of the war meant that the Royal Navy returned to a peacetime level of mobilisation and both the number of ships and the amount of staff needed to be reduced to save money. Oracle was declared superfluous to operational requirements and, on 1 February 1920 and placed in reserve. Soon after, the destroyer was decommissioned and, on 30 October 1921, sold to W. & A.T. Burden to be broken up.

Pennant numbers

References

Citations

Bibliography

 
 
 
 
 
 
 
 
 
 
 
 
 
 

1915 ships
Admiralty M-class destroyers
Ships built on the River Wear
World War I destroyers of the United Kingdom